An abstract strategy game is a board, card or other game where game play includes no random chance and provides perfect information. Many abstract strategy games include no theme. Some games can also be played on pen and paper.

Chess and chess-like games 

Apocalypse
Arimaa
Chaturaji (India)
Chaturanga (Indian chess)
Chess (Western chess)
Congo
Courier chess (German chess)
Crazyhouse
Dameo
Djambi (modern French chess variant)
Duell (chess)
Fortress chess (Russia)
Four-player chess
Hexagonal chess
Hnefatafl (Nordic chess-like game)
Hiashatar (Mongolian chess variant)
Hive (boardless chess-like game)
Infinite chess
Janggi (Korean chess)
Jeson Mor (Mongolian chess variant)
Ko Shogi (Shogi Variant based on xiangqi and go)
Kruzno
Maharajah and the Sepoys (Indian chess variant)
Makruk (Thai chess)
Ploy (board game)
Rollerball (chess variant)
Senterej (Ethiopian chess)
Shatar (Mongolian chess)
Shatranj (Persian and Arabian chess)
Shogi (Japanese chess)
Shogi variants (other shogi-like games)
Sittuyin (Burmese chess)
Suffragetto (Suffragettes vs. Police)
Tamerlane chess (Persian)
Three-player chess
Trappist-1
Xiangqi (Chinese and Vietnamese chess)

Paper and pencil games 

Bulls and Cows
Col (game)
Dots and Boxes
Hackenbush
Join Five
Kropki
Labyrinth (paper-and-pencil game)
Notakto
Order and Chaos
Paper Soccer
Phutball
Racetrack (game)
Sim
Snort
SOS (game)
Sprouts
Tennis (paper game)

"N-in-a-row" games 
All-in-a-row games involve placing and/or moving pieces on a game board attempting to create a layout of n of your pieces in a straight line (often n=3, but not always). Positional games involve only playing pieces, with no movement or captures afterwards. Many of these positional games can also be played as paper and pencil games, and these are marked †. (Generally, 3D games are difficult to play on paper.)
 Positional "n-in-a-row" games

 Connect Four †
 Connect 4x4
 Connect6 †
 Gobblet
 Gomoku †
 Grinder
 Hijara †
 Join Five (aka. Morpion solitaire, Cross 'n' Lines, Line Game) †
 Quarto
 Qubic
 Renju †
 Rhumb Line †
 Score Four
 Quantum tic-tac-toe
 Tic Tac Toe (aka Noughts and Crosses) †
 Ultimate tic-tac-toe
 Yinsh

 Non-Positional "n-in-a-row" games, i.e. games with movements and/or captures

 Achi
 Boku
 Check Lines
 Dala
 Dara
 Kamisado
 Morabaraba
 Morris - Three, Six and Nine men's morris
 Nine Holes
 Pentago
 Pente, a variant of Ninuki-renju
 Picaria
 Shax
 Shisima (Rota)
 Square chess
 Tant Fant
 Tapatan
 Teeko
 Tsoro Yematatu
 Wali

Blockade games 
Blockade games primarily involve moving your pieces, following the game rules, so as to block your opponent from having any move they can make. In symmetric blockade games, both players have the same number of pieces with the same movement capabilities. In asymmetric blockade games, players have different numbers of pieces with different movement capabilities—usually one player having a single piece of greater movement range and the other player having multiple pieces of lesser movement capabilities.
Symmetric Blockade Games

Amazons
 Madelinette / "Lost in the Berry Patch"
Mlýnek
Mū tōrere
 Pat Gonu
Pong Hau K'i (aka Sua tok tong, Umul Gonu, Gang Gonu or Do-guti)
Tako Judo (Octopuss Wrestling)
Toads and Frogs

Asymmetric Blockade Games

Bear games
Fox and Hounds
Hare games
Koti Keliya

Connection games
A connection game is a type of abstract strategy game in which players attempt to complete a specific type of connection with their pieces. This could involve forming a path between two or more goals, completing a closed loop, or connecting all of one's pieces so they are adjacent to each other. Those marked † can also be played as paper and pencil games.

 Bridg-It, also called Gale †
 Blue Lagoon
 Crosstrack
 Dots
 Dots and boxes †
 Gonnect
 Havannah †
 Hex †
 Onyx
 Ponte del Diavolo
 PÜNCT
 Selfo
 Shannon switching game
 Slither
 Star
 *Star †
 Tak
 Through the Desert
 Trax
 Trxilt
 TwixT († with modified rules)
 Y †

Stacking games 

Accasta
Battle Sheep
Death Stacks
DVONN (part of the GIPF project, listed below)
Emergo
Focus
Gounki
Lasca
Pylos
Santorini
Torres

Annihilation games 
This category is in development, while we re-analyze the collection of games listed under "Other Games".
Annihilation games have as a central goal the idea of capturing or eliminating all of the opponents pieces before they can capture yours. The rules for how a capture is accomplished vary greatly. A classic example of this category is checkers. Two most common forms of capture are jump (one piece jumps an opponent's piece) and custodial (one piece is surrounded by two or more opponent pieces). We include here both "capture and remove from the board" games and "capture and convert to one of your pieces" games.

Agon
Alquerque
Apit-sodok
Armenian checkers
Astar
Ataxx
Awithlaknannai Mosona
Bizingo
Brax
Butterfly
Camelot
Canadian checkers
Choko
Cinc Camins
Dablot Prejjesne
Daldøs
Dameo
Dash-guti
Checkers (also known as draughts)
Egara-guti
Fanorona
Four Field Kono
Gala (game)
Gol-skuish
High Jump
Italian Damone
Jungle (Dou Shou Qi, The Game of Fighting Animals)
Jul-Gonu
Keny
Kharbaga
Kolowis Awithlaknannai (Fighting Serpents)
Kotu Ellima
Lau kata kati
Liberian Queah
Mak-yek
Meurimueng-rimueng peuet ploh or Dam-daman or Ratti-chitti-bakri
Ming Mang
Peralikatuma
Permainan-Tabal
Pretwa
Rek (Game), and its variant Min Rek Chanh
Sáhkku
Stay Alive (game)
Satoel
Sixteen Soldiers (aka "Cows and Leopards" or "Sholo guti")
Surakarta
Terhuchu
Tobit
Tuknanavuhpi
Tukvnanawopi
Turkish draughts
Watermelon Chess
Yoté
Zamma

Counting games 
This category is in development, while we re-analyze the collection of games listed under "Other Games".
These games involve some aspect of counting, especially to determine the relative outcomes of various alternatives at points along the way. A classic example of this category are the various Mancala games.

Chopsticks
Mancala and related games

Positional games 
This category is in development, while we re-analyze the collection of games listed under "Other Games".
Positional games allow no captures, but require some arrangement of pieces that constitutes a "win". This is a broad category that includes, as sub-categories, both the "All-in-a-row" games and the "Blockade" games. We include here only the positional games that do not fit into those two categories.

Abalone
Chinese checkers
Conspirateurs
Diaballik
Five Field Kono
Halma
Neutron
Pyramid
Salta
Ugolki

Hunt games 
This category is in development, while we re-analyze the collection of games listed under "Other Games".
In "hunting" games, one player's pieces are "hunting" the other player's pieces, so that one player is trying to capture the second player's pieces, while the second player is trying to avoid captures, arranging their pieces to surround the hunters, to be protected from the hunters, etc. A classic example of this category is Fox and Geese. These games tend to have the hunter playing a "capture" game while the prey is playing a "positional" game.

Aadu puli attam
Adugo
Asalto
Bagh bandi
Bagha-Chall
Buga-shadara
Catch the Hare (aka Cercar la Liebre or Corner the Rabbit)
Demala diviyan keliya
Fox games, such as Fox and Geese
Hat diviyan keliya
Kaooa
Khla si ko
Komikan
Len Choa
Leopard hunt game
Len cúa kín ngoa
Main Tapal Empat
Meurimueng-rimueng-do
Meurimueng-rimueng peuet ploh
Pulijudam
Rimau
Rimau-rimau
Sher-bakar
Sixteen Soldiers (aka "Cows and Leopards" or "Sholo guti")
Sua Ghin Gnua (aka Tigers and Oxen)
Tiger and Buffaloes
Tiger game

Non-combinatorial abstract strategy games 
These games include hidden information or set up, random elements (e.g. rolling dice or drawing cards or tiles) or simultaneous movement.

Agricola
Ashtapada
Alhambra
Baccarat
Backgammon
Bang!
Battleship
Black Box
Blackjack
Boggle
Bul
Carcassonne
Catan
Clue
Concentration
Contract bridge
Cribbage
Dark Chess
Dominoes
Dungeons & Dragons
Farkle
Feudal
Gin rummy
Hearts
Ingenious
Kriegspiel
Liar's dice
Liubo
Lost Cities
Luzhanqi
Mafia/Werewolf
Magic: The Gathering
Mahjong
Mastermind
Monopoly
Pachisi
Pandemic
Patolli
Pit
Plateau
Poker (e.g. Texas hold'em, Five-card draw)
Power Grid
Puerto Rico
Rock paper scissors
Royal Game of Ur
Rummikub
Scrabble
Senet
Spades
Stratego
Tâb 
Ticket to Ride
Tigris and Euphrates
Tikal
Uno
Yahtzee

Abstract strategy games that depict conquest of the world or entire continents
Axis & Allies
Diplomacy
Risk

Other games 
Those marked † can also be played as paper and pencil games. This category is being reviewed, with some games being moved to other named categories. The review is complete through the C's.

Abacus checkers
Awithlaknakwe
Blokus
Blue and Gray
Breakthrough
Breakthru
Cathedral
Chomp
Clobber
Conquest
Cram (game) 
Crossings
Dawson's Kayles
Diamond
Dodgem
Domineering
Downfall
En Gehé
Entropy (1977)
Epaminondas
Felli
Fetaix
Fibonacci nim
Fitchneal
Game of the Amazons
Game of the Generals
The GIPF project games:
GIPF
TAMSK
ZÈRTZ
TZAAR
LYNGK
Go
Grundy's game
Halatafl
Hare & Tortoise
Hnefatafl
Indian and jackrabbits
Jarmo
Joust
Kayles
Kalah
Kensington
Khet
Konane
Kuzushi
L game
Leap Frog (board game)
Lines of Action
Lotus
Ludus latrunculorum
Makonn
Martian chess (for two to six players)
Mozaic
Nations: A Simulation Game in International Politics
Nim †
Northcott's Game
Number Scrabble
Paddles
Pasang
Patterns II
Ponte del Diavolo
Quod †
Quoridor
Reversi, also known as Othello
Rhumb Line
Rhythmomachy
Ringo
So Long Sucker
Subtract a square
Sz'Kwa
Tafl games
Terrace
Three Musketeers
Thud
Wythoff's game

References

Bibliography
 Bell, R.C., (1979), Board and Table Games from Many Civilizations, p. 478, which refers to our "Blockade Games" as "Blocking Games".
 Drabble, Margaret, (2010), The Pattern in the Carpet: A Personal History with Jigsaws, p. 66. "Irving Finkel, the colourful curator of the Department of Ancient Near East at the British Museum, is an expert on games of the ancient world. All games, he claims, fit into groups -- race games, all-in-a-row games, hunt games, position games, counting games and war games."
D. Hefetz, M. Krivelevich, M. Stojaković and T. Szabó: Positional Games, Oberwolfach Seminars, Vol. 44, Birkhäuser Basel, 2014.
Michaelsen, Peter, (2014) "Haretavl – Hare and Hounds as a board game", in Sport und Spiel bei den Germanen, M. Teichert, pp. 197–216
Popova, Assia, (1974). "Analyse formelle et classification des jeux de calculs mongols" in Études Mongoles 5, pp. 7–60.

List of abstract strategy games